The Tiger Woman may refer to:

 The Tiger Woman (1917 film), a 1917 film starring Theda Bara
 The Tiger Woman (1944 film), a 1944 film serial starring Linda Stirling
 The Tiger Woman (1945 film), a 1945 film starring Adele Mara

Nicknames
 Betty May, singer, actress, and model known as "Tiger Woman"
Clara Phillips, chorus girl and showgirl who murdered Alberta Meadows nicknamed the "Tiger Woman"